Victoria Park High School is a public English medium co-educational day school high school situated in the suburb of Walmer in Port Elizabeth in the Eastern Cape province of South Africa. It is one of the top and most academic schools in Port Elizabeth. The school was established in 1940.

General
Approximately 1000 students attend grades 8–12 and participate in activities, sports and the cultural arts. To maintain a favourable pupil/teacher ratio, the Governing body employs approximately 20 extra teachers.

Headmasters
H.W. Arnott(1940–1947)
T.C Thorp (1947–1965 )
G.A.C. Pearson (1966–1982)
D. Blake (1983–1993)
P. Hollely (1993–2002)
M.J. Vermaak (2003–2021)
A. Jansen (2021-2022)
G. Jacobson (acting principal 2022-present)

History

The school was established in January 1940, and was situated in the Dutch Reformed Church hall in South End. The first day saw an enrolment of 38 grade 9 pupils, one assistant woman teacher and H.W. Arnott, the headmaster.  It was he who came up with the school's motto, "Vivite Fortes", meaning "Live courageously". Sport was played on the fields of Walmer Rugby & Cricket Clubs, and two hired tennis courts in Second Avenue.

In 1941, a grade 10 was added, along with an extra teacher. When Arnott returned in 1945 after service in World War II, the school had moved to its present site at the junction of Victoria Park Drive and First Avenue Walmer, as well as having classes from grade 9 to Matric.

Clubs and societies

Cultural societies

 Drama
 Jazz band
 Wind Band
 Steel band
 Choir
 Impulse (cultural society)
 Debating
 Quiz Team
 The VIP (School Newspaper)
 Toastmasters
 Photography
 Science Club
 Hiking Club
 Cultural Society
 Art Club
 Ballroom Dancing

Service clubs

 Interact (Grades: 10–12)
 Junioract (Grades: 8–9)
 TAG (Teenage Action Group)
 TADA (Teenagers Against Drug & Alcohol Abuse)
 LIFE(Life is for everyone)
 PAW (Protecting Animals Worldwide)
 ACC (Aids Care Committee)
 Blood Peer Promoters
 First Aid
 ECO (Environmental Caring Organisation)
 Sound and Lighting Technicians

Self improvement 

 Life (Love Is For Everyone)
 VP Toastmasters

Leadership groups
 Junior City Council
 RCL (Representative Council of Learners)
 Councilors (School Prefects)

Sport

The following are sports played by both sexes at Victoria Park High School:

 Athletics
 Cricket
 Golf
 Hockey
 Soccer
 Swimming
 Tennis
 Squash
 Paddling
 Chess
 Hiking
 Netball (girls only)
 Rugby (boys only)

References

External links
School Website
Victoria Park Presents Joseph and the Amazing Technicolour Dreamcoat
Victoria Park High School Helps Coega Door of Hope
Victoria Park High School Winter Clothing Drive

High schools in South Africa
Schools in the Eastern Cape
Educational institutions established in 1940
1940 establishments in South Africa
Port Elizabeth